The Highlands is a retail park in Triadelphia, West Virginia, 7 miles east of the city of Wheeling. It opened in August 2004 with what was then the only Cabela's within a 5-hour distance. Eventually it featured a JCPenney, Kohl's, Target and Walmart as anchor tenants. It also contains over 100 shops, restaurants, services, car dealerships and attractions such as Menards, Hobby Lobby, Bath & Body Works, Books-A-Million,  iLane Bryant, Old Navy, The Shoe Dept. and a 14-screen Marquee Cinemas. With over 1.4 million square feet of retail space, it is the largest shopping complex in the Northern Panhandle of West Virginia.

The center is owned and operated by its developer, the Ohio County Development Authority. It is located at Cabela Drive (Exit 10) off Interstate 70.

References

External links 
 The Highlands Official Website
 West Liberty University - Highlands Center

Buildings and structures in Ohio County, West Virginia
Tourist attractions in Ohio County, West Virginia
Shopping malls in West Virginia
Shopping malls established in 2004